Navruz Jurakobilov is an Uzbek judoka. He competed at the 2012 Summer Olympics, but eliminated in the round of 16 by Rasul Boqiev.

References

External links
 

Living people
Olympic judoka of Uzbekistan
Uzbeks
Uzbekistani male judoka
Judoka at the 2012 Summer Olympics
1984 births
Asian Games medalists in judo
Judoka at the 2010 Asian Games
Judoka at the 2014 Asian Games
Asian Games bronze medalists for Uzbekistan
Medalists at the 2010 Asian Games
Medalists at the 2014 Asian Games